Aygün is both a surname and a given name. Notable people with the name include:

 Emre Aygün, Turkish footballer
 Necat Aygün, Turkish footballer
 Aygun Kazimova, Azerbaijani singer

See also
 Aygün, Kulp
 Ayios Yeoryios, Famagusta, Cyprus village

Turkish-language surnames